Scopula loxosema is a moth of the family Geometridae. It was described by Turner in 1908. It is found in Australia (Victoria).

References

Moths described in 1908
loxosema
Moths of Australia